Liang Zongdai (Chinese: 梁宗岱) (1903–1983) was a Chinese poet and translator. Born in Baise, Guangxi, he went to Europe to study western languages in 1924. His translation of Tao Qian's poems into French was published by Lemarget, Paris in 1930, with a preface by Paul Valéry whom the young poet had visited at home in 1926.

He was one of the most popular "new poets" writing in free verse, after the May Fourth Movement in China. His most famous work is the non-fictional Poetry and Truth. The title was borrowed from Goethe's autobiography Dichtung und Wahrheit.

Liang's translations into Chinese include poetry by Shakespeare, Blake, Rilke, and Valéry, as well as Montaigne's essays. His translation of Goethe's Faust was destroyed during the Cultural Revolution.

He was persecuted during the Cultural Revolution, and devoted the last part of his life to the study of Chinese medicine. He married three times. His last wife was a performer of Cantonese opera, who wrote a short memoir, recollecting her relationship with the poet.

External links

A memoire (in Chinese)

Republic of China poets
People's Republic of China poets
English–Chinese translators
French–Chinese translators
Chinese–French translators
People from Xinhui District
Poets from Guangdong
Republic of China translators
People's Republic of China translators
Victims of the Cultural Revolution
20th-century Chinese translators
Translators of Johann Wolfgang von Goethe
Translators of William Shakespeare
Writers from Jiangmen
1903 births
1983 deaths